Sebastian Langeveld (born 17 January 1985) is a Dutch professional road racing cyclist, who currently rides for UCI WorldTeam .

Career

His biggest win to date was the 2011 Omloop Het Nieuwsblad with  where he beat Juan Antonio Flecha in a photofinish. On 17 August 2011, it was announced that Langeveld was joining Australian team  for its début season in 2012.

Major results

2003
 10th Road race, UCI Junior Road World Championships
2004
 8th Overall Flèche du Sud
1st Stage 2
2005
 1st  Road race, National Under-23 Road Championships
 1st Stage 7 Olympia's Tour
 2nd Ronde van Vlaanderen U23
 2nd Omloop der Kempen
 7th Paris–Roubaix Espoirs
2006
 1st Grand Prix Pino Cerami
 2nd Road race, National Road Championships
 7th GP Herning
 9th Overall Four Days of Dunkirk
2007
 1st  Overall Ster Elektrotoer
 2nd Road race, National Road Championships
 9th Overall Tour de Luxembourg
2008
 2nd Trofeo Sóller
 2nd Kuurne–Brussels–Kuurne
 4th Trofeo Pollença
 6th Overall Tour de Luxembourg
2009
 1st Egmond-pier-Egmond
 1st Grote Prijs Jef Scherens
 2nd Overall Sachsen Tour
1st Stages 2 & 4
 2nd Kampioenschap van Vlaanderen
 3rd Overall Eneco Tour
 6th Overall Ster Elektrotoer
 9th E3 Prijs Vlaanderen
 10th Overall Delta Tour Zeeland
2010
 2nd Overall Tour du Limousin
1st  Young rider classification
 6th E3 Prijs Vlaanderen
 10th Kuurne–Brussels–Kuurne
2011
 1st Omloop Het Nieuwsblad
 1st Stage 1 (TTT) Tirreno–Adriatico
 4th Trofeo Deia
 5th Trofeo Inca
 5th Tour of Flanders
2012
 1st Stage 1 (TTT) Tirreno–Adriatico
 3rd  Team time trial, UCI Road World Championships
 5th Road race, National Road Championships
 9th Overall Eneco Tour
1st Stage 2 (TTT)
2013
 3rd Road race, National Road Championships
 5th E3 Harelbeke
 7th Paris–Roubaix
 10th Tour of Flanders
2014
 National Road Championships
1st  Road race
2nd Time trial
 1st Egmond-pier-Egmond
 3rd Amstel Curaçao
 8th Paris–Roubaix
 9th Overall Eneco Tour
 10th Tour of Flanders
2015
 3rd Egmond-pier-Egmond
2016
 2nd Overall Czech Cycling Tour
1st Stage 1 (TTT)
2017
 3rd Paris–Roubaix
2018
 8th Tacx Pro Classic
2019
 2nd Time trial, National Road Championships
 7th Overall Étoile de Bessèges
 10th Time trial, UEC European Road Championships
 10th Paris–Roubaix
2020
 1st Egmond-pier-Egmond
2021
 2nd Time trial, National Road Championships

Grand Tour general classification results timeline

Classics results timeline

See also
 List of Dutch Olympic cyclists

References

External links

Cycling Base: Sebastian Langeveld
Cycling Quotient: Sebastian Langeveld

1985 births
Living people
Dutch male cyclists
Sportspeople from Leiden
Cyclists at the 2012 Summer Olympics
Olympic cyclists of the Netherlands
UCI Road World Championships cyclists for the Netherlands
Cyclists from South Holland
20th-century Dutch people
21st-century Dutch people